Harold Hooke (9 May 1911 – 23 December 1978) was an  Australian rules footballer who played with North Melbourne in the Victorian Football League (VFL).

Notes

External links 

1911 births
1978 deaths
Australian rules footballers from Victoria (Australia)
North Melbourne Football Club players